This is a list of Italian television related events from 1965.

Events
20 March – The 10th Eurovision Song Contest is held at the Sala di Concerto della RAI in Naples. Luxembourg wins the contest with the song "Poupée de cire, poupée de son", performed by France Gall.

Debuts

Serials 

 Le avventure di Laura Storm (Laura Storm's adventures) – comedy-mystery serial by Camillo Mastrocinque, written by Leo Chiosso, with Lauretta Masiero as a dynamic journalist-detective and Carlo Giuffrè as her director-fiancée; 2 seasons.

Television shows

Drama 

 Il marito geloso (The eternal husband)  and Il giocatore (The gambler)  – by Edmo Fenoglio, from the Fyodor Dostoevsky’s stories, both with Warner Bentivenga and Tino Carraro.

Miniseries 

 David Copperfield, by Anton Giulio Majano, from the Charles Dickens’ novel, with Giancarlo Giannini in the title role, in 8 episodes; extraordinary public success, with 15 million viewiers.
Scaramouche – by Daniele D’Anza, with Domenico Modugno (author of the music too) and Carla Gravina; in five episodes. First Italian musical fiction, about the life of Tiberio Fiorilli.
Vita di Dante (Life of Dante) – by Vittorio Cottafavi, with Giorgio Albertazzi (Dante Alighieri) and Loretta Goggi (Beatrice), script by Giorgio Prosperi; 3 episodes.
La donna di fiori (The queen of clubs) – by Anton Giulio Majano, with Ubaldo Lay (as Lieutenant Sheridan), Andrea Checchi and Luigi Vannucchi; in 6 episodes. First of the four “Sheridan’s queen”, miniseries with the popular detective as protagonist and titles inspired by the playing cards.

Variety 

 Adriano clan – directed by Gianfranco Bettetini, with Adriano Celentano and other young singers of his record company.
Le nostre serate (Our evenings) – by Carla Ragionieri; musical show with Giorgio Gaber.

News and educational 
Gesù mio fratello (Jesus my brother), La donna nella resistenza (Women in the resistance), Il giorno della pace (The day of the peace), Philippe Petain, processo a Vichy (Philippe Petain, process to Vichy) – documentaries by Liliana Cavani. Philippe Petain is awarded at the 26th Venice International Film Festival as best TV documentary.

Ending this year

Births
19 February - Veronica Pivetti, actress
1 April - Simona Ventura, TV host and X Factor judge
17 May - Claudia Koll, actress
10 August - Lorella Cuccarini, singer, TV host and actress

Deaths

See also
List of Italian films of 1965

References